Aurel Dragoș Munteanu (16 January 1942 – 30 May 2005) was a Romanian author and the director of TVR following the Romanian Revolution making him a key part of the National Salvation Front's ability to gain support.

Munteanu held various positions as the Romanian Ambassador to the United States, Romanian Ambassador to the United Nations and president of UN Security Council. On 9 February 1990, Munteanu was released from the office of President of the Romanian Radio Channel and on 23 February 1990, he was appointed ambassador and permanent representative of Romania of the United Nations.

He is buried in Washington, D.C., USA.

References

(in Romanian)
(in Romanian)
(in Romanian)
(in Romanian)

1942 births
2005 deaths
Place of birth missing
Place of death missing
Ambassadors of Romania to the United States
Permanent Representatives of Romania to the United Nations
United Nations Security Council officials
People of the Romanian Revolution